The following results are for the 2018 Badminton Asia Championships group stage, which decide who will be advanced to the knockout stage.

Men's singles

Group A

Group B

Group C

Group D

Women's singles

Group A

Group B

Group C

Group D

Men's doubles

Group A

Group B

Group C

Group D

Women's doubles

Group A

Group B

Group C

Group D

Mixed doubles

Group A

Group B

Group C

Group D  

Badminton Asia Championships
Asian Badminton Championships
Badminton
Badminton tournaments in China
International sports competitions hosted by China
2018 in Chinese sport
Sport in Wuhan
Badminton Asia Championships